Ludwig Koch is the name of:

 Ludwig Koch (painter) (1866–1934), Austrian equestrian painter
 Ludwig Carl Christian Koch (1825–1908), German entomologist and arachnologist
 Ludwig Karl Koch (1881–1974), German-born British broadcaster and wildlife sound recordist
 Ludwig Koch, father of kidnap victim Natascha Kampusch

See also 
 Carl Ludwig Koch (1778-1857), German entomologist and arachnologist